Marie Glory (born Raymonde Louise Marcelle Toully; 3 March 1905 – 24 January 2009) was a French actress.

Biography
Raymonde Louise Marcelle Toully was born on 3 March 1905 at Mortagne-au-Perche in Normandy. Her father was a hairdresser, whilst her mother was a painter. When she was still an infant, the family moved to Rouen, where Toully studied at the Lycée Jeanne d'Arc.

At the age of 18, Toully moved to Paris, where she began attending dance classes. In Paris, she entered the first of many beauty contests, winning second place and her first professional job, working as a model, posing for postcards and posters.

She made her film debut in 1924 with a small role in Raymond Bernard's historical epic Le Miracle des Loups under the stage name Arlette Genny, which she used until 1927.
 
From then on, she was credited under the name "Marie Glory". In the three hours plus French-German co-production L'Argent (1928), directed by Marcel L'Herbier, she played the lead female role alongside Brigitte Helm and Pierre Alcover. She starred with Jean Angelo, Lil Dagover, and Gaston Modot in another French-German co-production, Henri Fescourt's Monte Cristo. She made her German film debut in 1929 in Father and Son, directed by Géza von Bolváry.

Her first talking picture was Leo Mittler's Le Roi de Paris (1930), co-starring with the exiled Serbian actor Ivan Petrovich. In the 1930s, she played predominantly leading roles in such films as Les Deux mondes, directed by Ewald André Dupont, and Madame ne veut pas d'enfants, directed by Hans Steinhoff.

In 1939, she had her last leading role. She made only one film in the 1940s, Dagli Appennini alle Ande (1943). During this time, she moved to Algeria, and then Martinique, where she worked in propaganda radio.

In the early 1950s, she was cast in Italian film productions playing minor roles. Her last film appearance was in 1960; her last television appearance was in 1964.

In the mid-1990s, she was interviewed for Kevin Brownlow's documentary about the history of silent film: Cinema Europe: The Other Hollywood. Glory died on 24 January 2009, less than two months shy of her 104th birthday.

Filmography

as Marie Glory
 L'Argent (dir. Marcel L'Herbier, 1928), as Line Hamelin
 Father and Son (dir. Géza von Bolváry, 1929), as Stella Valéry
 Monte Cristo (dir. Henri Fescourt, 1929), as Valentine de Villefort
 L'Enfant de l'amour (dir. Marcel L'Herbier, 1930), as Aline
 The King of Paris (dir. Leo Mittler, 1930), as Lucienne
 Les Deux mondes (dir. E. A. Dupont, 1930), as Esther Goldschneider
 Levy and Company (dir. André Hugon, 1930), as Esther Lévy
 Les Chevaliers de la montagne (dir. Mario Bonnard, 1930), as Mary
 La Folle aventure (dir. André-Paul Antoine, 1931), as Elisabeth
 The Typist (dir. Wilhelm Thiele, 1931), as Simone Dupré
  (dir. Hans Behrendt, 1931), as Mademoiselle Yseult
 Amourous Adventure (dir. Wilhelm Thiele, 1932), as Irène Vernier
 You Will Be a Duchess (dir. René Guissart, 1932), as Annette Poisson
 Monsieur, Madame and Bibi (dir. Jean Boyer and Max Neufeld, 1932), as Clary Baumann
  (dir. Jean Tarride, 1932), as Suzanne 
 A Star Disappears (dir. Robert Villers, 1932), as herself
 Mon cœur balance (dir. René Guissart, 1932), as Geneviève
 Madame ne veut pas d'enfants (dir. Hans Steinhoff, 1933), as Elyane
  (dir. Victor Janson and Jean Bernard-Derosne, 1933), as Monique
 Charlemagne (dir. Pierre Colombier, 1933), as Rose Val
  (dir. André Berthomieu, 1934), as Denise
 The Typist Gets Married (dir. Joe May and René Pujol, 1934), as Simone
  (dir. Julien Duvivier, 1934), as Thérèse
 The King of Paris (dir. Jack Raymond, 1934), as Maike Tamara
 Votre sourire (dir. Monty Banks and Pierre Caron, 1934), as Colette
 The Terrible Lovers (dir: Marc Allégret, 1936), as Lucie
 Death on the Run (dir. André Berthomieu, 1936), as Myrra
 With a Smile (dir. Maurice Tourneur, 1936), as Gisèle Berthier
 L'Homme sans coeur (dir. Léo Joannon, 1937), as Sylvette
  (dir. André Berthomieu, 1937), as Jeannine 
 People Who Travel (dir. Jacques Feyder, 1938), as Pepita
  (dir. Giorgio Ferroni and Marcel L'Herbier, 1939), as Elena
 Naples Will Never Die (dir. Amleto Palermi, 1939), as Annie Fusco
 A Wife in Danger (dir. Max Neufeld, 1939), as Mary Arnold Verdier
  (dir. Marcel L'Herbier, 1942), as Hélène
 Dagli Appennini alle Ande (dir. Flavio Calzavara, 1943)
 La Folla (dir. Silvio Laurenti Rosa, 1951)
 Adorable Creatures (dir. Christian-Jaque, 1952), as Madeleine Michaud
 La Fugue de Monsieur Perle (dir. Pierre Gaspard-Huit, 1952), as Juliette Perle
 What Scoundrels Men Are! (dir. Glauco Pellegrini, 1953), as Elsa
 The Bachelor (dir. Antonio Pietrangeli, 1955), as Catherine
 And God Created Woman (dir. Roger Vadim, 1956), as Mme. Tardieu
  (dir. Pierre Chenal, 1958), as La patronne du café
 Premier mai (dir. Luis Saslavsky, 1958)
 The Cat (dir. Henri Decoin, 1958)
 Ramuntcho (dir. Pierre Schoendoerffer, 1959), as Franchita
 The Cat Shows Her Claws (dir. Henri Decoin, 1960), as La concierge
  (TV series, 1964)

as Arlette Genny
 Le Miracle des loups (dir. Raymond Bernard, 1924)
 Monsieur le directeur (1924)
 Les Dévoyés (1925)
 Miss Helyett (1927)
 La Maison sans amour (1927)
 Little Devil May Care (dir. Marcel L'Herbier, 1928), as A little thief (uncredited)

References

External links

Marie Glory at lesgensducinéma.com 

1905 births
2009 deaths
People from Mortagne-au-Perche
French film actresses
French silent film actresses
French centenarians
20th-century French actresses
Women centenarians